Galivarz (also Romanized as Galīvarz; also known as Galavarz, Galeh Varz, Galevarz, Gīlāvarz, Gilāwarz, Kalavarz, Kalooraz, Kalvarz, and Kulyavar) is a village in Kalashtar Rural District, in the Central District of Rudbar County, Gilan Province, Iran. At the 2006 census, its population was 49, in 17 families.

References 

Populated places in Rudbar County